Municipal elections in Ontario, a province of Canada, are held every four years. Municipalities in Ontario held an election on 25 October 2010. Prior to 2006, elections were held every three years.

Elections
2022
2018
2014
2010
2006
2003
2000
1997
1994
1991
1988
1985
1982
1980
1978
1976
1974
1972
1969
1957
1953

See also
Municipal elections in Canada